In the Game is a 2015 documentary film directed by Peabody award-winner Maria Finitzo that follows the ups and downs of a girls’ soccer team. Set is a predominantly Hispanic neighborhood, this film chronicles the obstacles that struggling low-income families and students must face in their quest for higher education.

Elizabeth, captain of the girls soccer team, stresses going beyond what is expected of her teammates on and off the field. Many of the girls are juggling the pressures to get good grades, perform well for their soccer team, and help their families out financially by working. Kelly High School on Chicago’s south side is an inner city public school struggling to provide the basics for their students because of a lack of resources and funding with the school experiencing $4 million budget cuts. Many students of Kelly High School do not make it to college, either because they cannot compete academically or because their families do not have the financial resources to send them to college. The girls face an uneven playing field - or in the case of the girls at Kelly High School, no soccer field at all - little or no support, problems at home, uncertain futures, racial discrimination, and poverty, but remain driven and hopeful thanks to their teammates and the dedicated mentoring of their coach.

References

External links
 In the Game at Kartemquin Films
 

2015 films
Documentary films about women's association football
American sports documentary films
2015 documentary films
Women's soccer in the United States
Documentary films about Chicago
High school sports in Illinois
Documentary films about high school in the United States
Kartemquin Films films
Women's sports in Illinois
2010s English-language films
2010s American films